Frederick B. Chary (August 18, 1939 – November 14, 2020) was an American historian, emeritus professor of history at Indiana University Northwest, College of Arts and Sciences. He was past president and sponsor of the North American Bulgarian Studies Association.

Early life 
Chary earned an A.B. at University of Pennsylvania in 1962, and an M.A. and Ph.D. at University of Pittsburgh in 1963 and 1968, respectively. He was a Fulbright Scholar.

Career 
Chary had been at the faculty of Indiana University Northwest since 1967.

Chary served as guest lecturer at the U.S. State Department's Foreign Service Institute.

He was author of numerous published articles on the history of Bulgaria and the Bulgarian Jews.  His book "The Bulgarian Jews and the Final Solution" was published in 1972. It earned a very positive echo in Bulgaria and in Jewish circles. The book described the methods of the country's leadership and public to save the Bulgarian Jews from deportation to German death camps, the  only case where the entire Jewish community of a German ally survived during the Second World War.

Chary  traveled for his research Germany, Great Britain, Poland and the former Soviet Union. He visited also Israel for studies on the Holocaust. In Bulgaria he spent several months for studies in history archives and libraries. For his merits on Bulgarian and Jewish studies he was decorated by the Bulgarian National Assembly.

Selected publications 
 
 The History of Bulgaria. Greenwood Histories of the Modern Nations, 2011,

References

External links 
 
 
  Frederick B. Chary, Professor of History, College of Arts and Sciences, IU Northwest, Professor Emeritus of History
  Library of Congress, Frederick B. Chary
 

Living people
21st-century American historians
21st-century American male writers
Bulgarian literature
Indiana University faculty
University of Pittsburgh alumni
University of Pennsylvania alumni
1939 births
American male non-fiction writers